The Agrostistachydeae is a tribe of the subfamily Acalyphoideae, under the family Euphorbiaceae. It comprises 4 genera, which are monophyletic.

See also
 Taxonomy of the Euphorbiaceae

References

 
Euphorbiaceae tribes